Sanjeev Bagai is an Indian pediatrician and nephrologist known for his proficiency in pediatric nephrology and neonatology. He is chairman of the Nephron Clinic in New Delhi, India. He was a visiting professor of pediatrics at Saint Justin Hospital in Canada and University of Toledo, Ohio and has taught at the University of New South Wales, Sydney.

Early Life 
Bagai was a gold medalist from Bombay University. He received the prestigious Sir Dorab Tata Merit Scholarship and Bombay University Merit Scholarship.

Career 
Bagai was awarded him the Padma Shri for his contributions to medical science in 2008. He received the Dr. B. C. Roy Award the same year.  

He completed his graduation, MBBS, from the prestigious GS Medical College & KEM Hospital Bombay;  DCH, MD (Paed) from Asia’s largest Wadia children’s hospital Bombay; MNAMS(Paediatric); DNBE (Paediatric); MIPA(USA); Fellowship  in Prince Of Wales Children's Hospital, Australia-(FSCH); FIMSA; PhD(honris causa) (USA) -Doctorate in Paediatric Nephrology, National American University, Delaware, USA. 

He been the Vice Chairman, CEO, Director and Dean of numerous leading large corporate hospitals chains which he created and commissioned. He has formerly been the Vice Chairman of the Manipal Hospital Dwarka, New Delhi, Chief Executive Officer of Batra Hospital and Medical Research Centre, New Delhi and also been the Chief Executive Officer of Radiant life Care, New Delhi. He has also been the Medical Advisor and Director at Rockland Hospital, New Delhi.

Bagai has written several articles on health in Indian newspaper The Hindu,  and was also the Editor-in-Chief of the International Journal of Pediatric Nephrology. He is also the author of a thesis on pediatric enuresis. He has a series of publications in National & International Medical peer reviewed & indexed journals. He has helped numerous research protocols being developed and is on the expert research committees of various such associations.

Personal Life 
A born sportsman, he excelled in cricket, Football, Hockey and Athletics. He was the school & college captain in Cricket and was facilitated for exceptional sporting achievements in his college as the most outstanding Cricketer & Sportsman. He has represented state level in cricket.

Written work 
Bagai has written several articles on health in several Indian newspapers  and was Editor-in-Chief of the International Journal of Pediatric Nephrology. He is also the author of a thesis on pediatric enuresis. He has a series of publications in National & International Medical peer reviewed & indexed journals.

See also 
 Enuresis

References

External links 
 
 

Recipients of the Padma Shri in medicine
St. Xavier's College, Mumbai alumni
Indian paediatricians
Indian nephrologists
Indian medical writers
Dr. B. C. Roy Award winners
Living people
20th-century Indian medical doctors
1965 births